'''Northern Pacific Conference may refer to:
 Northern Pacific Conference (baseball)
 Northern Pacific Conference (women's)

See also 
 Northern Pacific Field Hockey Conference